Dinanath Pandey was an Indian politician belonging to Bharatiya Janata Party. He was elected as a member of the Bihar Legislative Assembly from Jamshedpur East in 1977, 1980 and 1990. He died on 11 January 2019 at the age of 85.

References

2019 deaths
Members of the Bihar Legislative Assembly
Bharatiya Janata Party politicians from Jharkhand
1930s births